Müllers Marionetten-Theater is a theatre in Wuppertal, North Rhine-Westphalia, Germany.

Theatres in Wuppertal
Puppet theaters
Puppetry in Germany